The 2014 Motor City Open is an International 70 tournament of the PSA World Tour. The event took place at the Birmingham Athletic Club in Detroit in the United States from 25 January to 28 January 2014. Mohamed El Shorbagy won his second Motor City Open title, beating Peter Barker in the final.

Prize money and ranking points
For 2014, the prize purse was $70,000. The prize money and points breakdown is as follows:

Seeds

Draw and results

See also
PSA World Tour 2014
Motor City Open (squash)

References

External links
PSA Motor City Open 2014 website
Motor City Open 2014 official website

Motor City Open (squash)
2014 in American sports
2014 in sports in Michigan
2014 in squash